Duluth is a former town of Grant County,  Nebraska, United States, farm land now devoid of any buildings and existing only as a railroad locator-marker.

History
Duluth was a flag stop on the railroad. It was likely named after Duluth, Minnesota.

References

Unincorporated communities in Grant County, Nebraska
Unincorporated communities in Nebraska